Jackie Cline is a former professional American football player who played defensive lineman for eight seasons for the Birmingham Stallions, Ottawa Rough Riders, Pittsburgh Steelers, Miami Dolphins, and Detroit Lions.

References

1960 births
American football defensive linemen
Birmingham Stallions players
Ottawa Rough Riders players
Pittsburgh Steelers players
Miami Dolphins players
Detroit Lions players
Alabama Crimson Tide football players
Living people